Jonathan Hazen (born June 18, 1990) is a Canadian professional ice hockey player. He is currently playing for HC Ajoie of the National League (NL).

Playing career 
Hazen played major junior hockey in the Quebec Major Junior Hockey League, with the Val d'Or Foreurs where he scored 224 points in 241 games played.

On March 19, 2011, the Florida Panthers of the National Hockey League signed Hazen to an entry level contract. He was assigned to play in the American Hockey League with the San Antonio Rampage to start the 2011–12 season. During both the 2012–13 and the 2013–14 seasons, Hazen divided his time between the Rampage and the Cincinnati Cyclones, the Panthers' ECHL affiliate.

In August 2014, Italian club, the HC Eppan Pirates announced that Hazen was joining the team on a one-year deal. Hazen made 44 appearances that season, tallying 27 goals and 40 assists. After one season, Hazen continued his European career in moving the Switzerland to sign an optional two-year contract with NLB club, HC Ajoie on March 31, 2015. He captured the NLB title in his first year with the club and played a big role in the team's success, scoring a league-best 44 goals in 62 contests to go along with 46 assists.

References

External links

1990 births
HC Ajoie players
Canadian ice hockey right wingers
Canadian people of Dutch descent
Cincinnati Cyclones (ECHL) players
HC Eppan Pirates players
Living people
San Antonio Rampage players
Ice hockey people from Quebec City
Val-d'Or Foreurs players
Canadian expatriate ice hockey players in Italy
Canadian expatriate ice hockey players in Switzerland